Pierre Beuchot (born 1938) is a French filmmaker.

Early life
Pierre Beuchot was born in 1938 in Les Pavillons-sous-Bois, near Paris, France.

Career
He is a filmmaker.

References

External links
 

Living people
1938 births
People from Seine-Saint-Denis